Sæle may refer to:

People
Anita Apelthun Sæle, a Norwegian politician with the Christian Democratic Party
Finn Jarle Sæle, a Norwegian editor, activist, theologian and former priest

Places
Sæle, Vestland, a village in Sogndal municipality in Vestland, Norway
Sæle Church, a church in Sogndal municipality in Vestland, Norway